The 1907 Open Championship was the 47th Open Championship, held 20–21 June at Royal Liverpool Golf Club in Hoylake, England. Arnaud Massy won his only major title, two strokes ahead of runner-up J.H. Taylor. From France, Massy was the first non-Briton to win the Open Championship.

Qualifying was introduced for the first time, replacing the 36-hole cut. It took place on Tuesday and Wednesday, 18–19 June, and the 193 entries were divided into two "sections," with each playing 36 holes on one day; the leading thirty players and ties from each section qualified. On Tuesday, 34 players scoring 165 or better qualified, led by Massy on 147. In windier conditions on Wednesday, 33 players at 170 or better qualified, led by Taylor on 154. There was some feeling that those in the first section would benefit from the day's rest.

In a strong wind on Thursday morning, Massy and Walter Toogood were the co-leaders after the first round at 76, with the next closest score at 79. After the second round that afternoon, Massy led at 157, one stroke over Taylor and Tom Ball, with Tom Williamson and George Pulford a further shot behind.

The strong wind persisted into Friday. In the morning, Massy scored 78 while Taylor's 76 gave him a one shot lead. Harry Vardon's 74 was the best round of the championship and moved him into a tie for third place with Pulford and Ball, five strokes behind Taylor.

In the afternoon, Massy's 77 earned him the title at 312, two strokes ahead of Taylor, who scored 80 for 314. Taylor had some difficulties on the third hole where he sliced his drive into some long grass and took a seven, going out in 41. He came home in 39, but it wasn't enough to make up for his miscues on the front nine.  Massy became the first overseas player to win the Open, while Taylor finished runner-up for the fourth successive time. Vardon's brother, Tom, made a powerful move up the leaderboard with a 75 in the final round to secure a tie for third.

Past champions in the field 

Source:

Failed to qualify: Jack White (1904), William Auchterlonie (1893).
Did not enter: Harold Hilton (1892, 1897).

Round summaries

First round
Thursday, 20 June 1907 (morning)

Source:

Second round
Thursday, 20 June 1907 (afternoon)

Source:

Third round
Friday, 21 June 1907 (morning)

Source:

Final round
Friday, 21 June 1907 (afternoon)

Source:

References

External links
Royal Liverpool 1907 (Official site)

The Open Championship
Golf tournaments in England
Sport in the Metropolitan Borough of Wirral
Open Championship
Open Championship
Open Championship